

1972

Medals

1976

Circulating coins

References

Bibliography 

 

Commemorative coins of the United States